Dennis Brinkmann (born 22 November 1978 in Essen) is a German football coach and former professional footballer who played as a defensive midfielder.

Life 
In his youth, Brinkmann played for various clubs in the Ruhr Area. He started his senior career at Borussia Dortmund in 1997.

From 1998 to 2003, he spent five years in the Oberliga and the Regionalliga with Rot-Weiss Essen. Then he went to 2. Bundesliga-side Alemannia Aachen.

Brinkmann then successfully spent two years in Aachen along with players like Frank Paulus and Emmanuel Krontiris. He was part of the so-called "New Alemannia" and was capped 54 times. However, in 2005 he went to Eintracht Braunschweig, which was also a member of the 2nd Bundesliga at that time.

Coaching career
After four years working as a youth coach and assistant manager of VfL Bochum, Brinkmann was hired by Wuppertaler SV from January 2016 as the U-19 manager and he would also serve as an office manager. On 28 November 2016, he left the position as U-19 manager and continued only as an office manager. He left the club at the end of the 2016–17 season and was appointed as the manager of TuRU Düsseldorf. He was fired on 29 October 2017.

On 30 January 2018 FC Gütersloh 2000 announced, that Brinkmann would be the manager for the 2018–19 season. His twin-brother, Tim Brinkmann, was also hired at the club as the sporting director. Both left the club on 26 February 2019.

Honors 
 Promotion to the Regionalliga West/Südwest with Rot-Weiss Essen in 1999
 Runner-Up in the 2003–04 DFB-Pokal

References

External links 
 

1978 births
Living people
German footballers
Borussia Dortmund II players
Eintracht Braunschweig players
Alemannia Aachen players
Rot-Weiss Essen players
TuS Koblenz players
Wuppertaler SV players
2. Bundesliga players
3. Liga players
Association football midfielders
Footballers from Essen